Keli is a 1991 Malayalam romantic drama film written by John Paul and directed by Bharathan. Starring Jayaram, Charmila, Innocent, Murali and Nedumudi Venu in pivotal roles, the film had songs composed by Bharathan himself. Location of this film was in Shoranur.

Synopsis
The film revolves around a disabled young man Narayanankutty who owns a stationery shop. He falls in love with a school teacher Sridevi. The film takes a turn when Hema, another teacher at the same school, is murdered. Narayanankutty is falsely accused in relation with the case, being trapped by Lazer, a corrupt businessman and politician.

Cast
 Jayaram as Narayanankutty
 Charmila as Sridevi
 Innocent as Lazer Muthalali
 Nedumudi Venu as "Romance" Kumaran
 Murali as Appootty
 K. P. A. C. Lalitha as Seemanthini
 Sukumari as Muthassi
 Balan K. Nair as Ramankutty Nair
 Unnimary as Mrs. Menon
 Syama as Hema
 Adoor Bhawani as Paruvamma
 Aboobacker as Chettiyar
 Mala Aravindan as Commentator

Soundtrack
The music was composed by Bharathan and the lyrics were written by Kaithapram.

The song "Thaaram Valkkannadi Nokki" is composed in Bharathan's favourite Carnatic raga, Hindolam. The song won K. S. Chithra the best female singer in that year's Kerala State Film Awards.

References

External links
 
 Keli at the Malayalam Movie Database

1991 films
1990s Malayalam-language films
Films scored by Bharathan
Films directed by Bharathan
1991 drama films